Crystal Spring Tea is a brand name of canned tea drink sold mostly in China. It was launched in the 1980s. It produces and distributes lemon tea and peach tea flavoured drinks at select key outlets. It is owned by AS Watson, the wholly owned subsidiary of Hutchison Whampoa Limited.

References

External links
Crystal Spring

AS Watson
Drink companies of Hong Kong
Hong Kong brands
1980s establishments in Hong Kong